Rohini Hattangadi (née Oak; born 11 April 1955) is an Indian actress, known for her work in Hindi, Telugu, Marathi, Tamil, Kannada, and Gujarati films, and Marathi soap operas and theatre. She has won two Filmfare Awards, one National Film Award, and is the only Indian actress to win the BAFTA Award for Best Actress in a Supporting Role for her performance as Kasturba Gandhi in Gandhi (1982).

An alumna of the National School of Drama of New Delhi, Hattangadi had worked mainly in theatre when she made her movie debut with Arvind Desai Ki Ajeeb Dastaan in 1978. Some of her noted cinematic roles were in such art films as Arth (1982), Party and Saaransh (1984).

Hattangadi was mostly offered character roles in mainstream Hindi cinema after her portrayal in Gandhi, often typecast in mother roles much ahead of her years. Respected for her acting prowess, she has appeared in over 80 feature films, and is active in theatre and television.

Early and personal life
Hattangadi was born in Pune as Rohini Oak. She attended Renuka Swaroop Memorial Girls High School, Pune.

She joined the National School of Drama (NSD) of New Delhi in 1971. Although the Film and Television Institute of India (FTII) was located in her hometown Pune, she did not join it because she was mainly interested in theatre and did not have early plans to enter cinema: "I just wanted to be an actor... My heart was in theatre because I learnt from my father (Anant Oak) that real acting is learnt through theatre. That's why I came all the way to Delhi to join NSD." At NSD, she met her future husband Jayadev Hattangadi, who was in the same batch as hers. They were trained together by Ebrahim Alkazi. Upon graduation in 1974, Rohini was awarded the Best Actress award and an award for Best all-round student, while Jayadev, who was being trained in direction, won the Best Director award. Jayadev and Rohini married the following year.
Rohini also received training in Indian classical dance forms, Kathakali and Bharatnatyam for more than eight years, under the guidance of Professor Surendra Wadgaonkar.

Rohini and Jayadev have a son, Aseem Hattangadi, who is a theatre actor and acted in Badal Sircar's play, Evam Indrajit, directed by his father. Jaydev Hattangadi died on 5 December 2008, aged 60, after a battle with cancer.

Career

Theatre
Rohini started her career with Marathi stage. Once in Mumbai while still at NSD, Jayadev and Rohini started a Marathi theatre group in Mumbai, called "Awishkar", which went on to produce over 150 plays. In 1975 she won the Best Actress Award at the Maharashtra State Drama Festival, for her performance in Changuna, a Marathi adaptation of Federico García Lorca's Spanish classic Yerma. The play was produced by "Awishkar" in Mumbai.

Hattangadi is the first woman to act in Kannada play Yakshagana, a folk play directed by K. Shivaram Karanth, and is the first woman in Asia to act in a Japanese Kabuki play, Ibaragi, directed by Shozo Sato, a Japanese director.

One play that Hattangadi was particularly appreciated for is Aparajita, based on a Bengali story by Nitin Sen. First staged in 1999, this 120-minute long solo-act play has over the years been performed in both Hindi and Marathi. Incidentally, it was her first performance in a long time to be directed by her husband, Jayadev Hattangadi. In all she has performed in five plays directed by him, including Medea, a Greek tragedy written by Euripides.

Her other theatre credits include Vijay Tendulkar's Mitra Chi Gosht, directed by Vinay Apte, Hori based on Premchand's Godaan, produced by IPTA, and most recently in the Hindi play Kohra with Sudha Chandran and Babul Bhavsar.

Hattangadi, along with husband Jayadev, ran "Kalashray", a centre for research, education in arts and talent encouragement in Mumbai, working with the underprivileged and developing tools for powerful communication. She won the 2004 Sangeet Natak Akademi Award for her contribution to Indian theatre.

Film
Hattangadi made her film debut with Saeed Akhtar Mirza's Arvind Desai Ki Ajeeb Dastaan in 1978. The film won the Filmfare Critics Award for Best Movie. This was followed by her appearance in Mirza's next picture, Albert Pinto Ko Gussa Kyon Ata Hai (1980), which won the same award, and Rabindra Dharmaraj's drama Chakra (1981). Her characters in these films were minor.

Her next film was Richard Attenborough's biographical film Gandhi (1982), based on the life of Mahatma Gandhi. She played Kasturba Gandhi, the wife of Mahatma, played by Ben Kingsley. The film was a major critical success, and among other awards won the Academy Award for Best Picture. Hattangadi's performance garnered her international recognition and she won the BAFTA Award for Best Actress in a Supporting Role in 1983, the only Asian to do that so far.

Despite the success she received for her role in Gandhi, the film was also credited with increasing "her screen age manifold". She was 27 when she played the middle-aged Kasturba, and from then on was offered roles of women of this age group. Hattangadi told of an instance when James Ivory wanted to cast for his film Heat and Dust, but he was surprised by how young she was when he met her and ultimately did not approach her for a part because he did not want to use make-up. Although theatre was her main interest, she stated that it was not enough financially, stating, "I realised that theatre won't be enough to make ends meet."

This was followed, however, by a string of acclaimed performances, starting with Mahesh Bhatt's Arth (1982), which won her the Filmfare Award for Best Supporting Actress. In 1984 she acted in Govind Nihalani's satirical drama Party (1984) for which she received the National Film Award for Best Supporting Actress. She followed it with two films in which she portrayed aging housewives, Mohan Joshi Hazir Ho! and Saaransh, both released in 1984. In Saaransh, she was the female lead along with Anupam Kher in his debut role. The film starred Hattangadi and Kher as B.V. and Parvati, an elderly couple struggling with the recent death of their son. Both Kher and Hattangadi were at their late 20s at the time, and The Tribune described them as giving "immortal performances". Her portrayal earned her a nomination for the Filmfare Award for Best Actress, but it further consolidated her image as a mother and by this time she was type-cast in Hindi commercial cinema in motherly roles.

She was later recognised for her small part in N. Chandra's Pratighaat (1987), and for her comic performances in Pankaj Parashar's ChaalBaaz and Ladaai, both released in 1989. She played the role of Sribaby, a drug kingpin, in Parashar's Jalwa (1987). It was in Indian parallel cinema, however, where she was offered demanding roles. Her films of this period include Govind Nihalani's Aghaat (1985), with Muzaffar Ali's Anjuman (1986) and Girish Kasaravalli's Mane and Ek Ghar (1991).

In 1990, she was again cast as the aging mother of Amitabh Bachchan in Agneepath, for which she was awarded her second Filmfare Award in the Best Supporting Actress category. Throughout the 1990s and the 2000s, she was cast by Rajkumar Santoshi in several of his films, such as Damini (1993), Ghatak: Lethal (1996) and Pukar (2000).

In 1995, she was cast alongside Mohanlal in the Malayalam film Agnidevan. In the film, she played a Jnanpith winning author and the matriarch of a joint-family that runs a leading regional newspaper.

Her performance in Rajkumar Hirani's directorial debut Munnabhai MBBS (2003) received positive reactions, and she later reprised her role in the Tamil version of the film, Vasool Raja MBBS (2004).

She also worked in the Marathi film Mumbai Pune Mumbai 3 (2018) in the role of Shubhhu Mavshi.

Television
Some of her television performances include Vimla Pandey of Mahayagya, the role of a Hindustani classical singer in Yeh Kahaan Aa Gaye Hum, a committed social worker in Intehaan and the unlettered and harassed Sakkubai in Hindustani.

Hattangadi played lead roles in the Marathi serials Char Divas Sasuche and Vahinisaheb and on ETV Marathi and Zee Marathi, respectively. She has played a parallel lead role in Marathi serial Honar Sun Me Hya Gharchi on Zee Marathi. She played the lead role in a series on politics in India, where she played the leader of a major political party. In Hindi, She played the role of an actress in Ghar Ki Lakshmi Betiyann as Gayatri Baa. Over the years, she has been seen in a number of TV serials including Mahayagya, Thoda Hai Thode Ki Zaroorat Hai, Teache, Maayke Se Bandhi Dor and more. She played a special appearance in Chhal — Sheh Aur Maat, which aired in the TV channel Colors TV. She played a mother-in-law in Tuza Maza Breakup. She is also seen as Kashibai in the Marathi serial Swamini produced by Viren Pradhan on Colors Marathi.

Filmography

Films

Television

Accolades

Footnotes

References

External links

 
 
 Adiyara Gahraya, from Saraansh with Anupam Kher

1951 births
Living people
Indian film actresses
Indian television actresses
Actresses in Hindi cinema
Actresses in Tamil cinema
Indian stage actresses
Recipients of the Sangeet Natak Akademi Award
National School of Drama alumni
Best Supporting Actress BAFTA Award winners
Best Supporting Actress National Film Award winners
Filmfare Awards winners
Actresses in Marathi theatre
Indian soap opera actresses
Actresses from Pune
Actresses in Hindi television
Actresses in Marathi cinema
20th-century Indian actresses
21st-century Indian actresses
Actresses in Marathi television
Actresses in Kannada theatre
Actresses in Malayalam cinema
Actresses in Telugu cinema